Unexpected Productions (UP) is an improvisational comedy company in Seattle, Washington, USA.  From their home at the Market Theater in Seattle's historic Pike Place Market, in Post Alley, Unexpected Productions produces year-round shows, teaches improv classes, and hosts the Seattle International Festival of Improvisation.

History

Unexpected Productions was formed by three different improv groups as the “Seattle Theatresports League”, and was the first improv group in the US to perform Theatresports, which now holds the title of the longest running show in Seattle.  By 1988, the group was exploring many additional forms of spontaneous theatre, and the name was changed to “Unexpected Productions”.  In June 2008, Unexpected Productions celebrated the 25th anniversary of its first Theatresports match.

Actor Brendan Fraser is among the graduates of Unexpected Productions improv classes, and Joel McHale was a Theatresports cast member from 1993 to 1997.

The Seattle International Festival of Improvisation

Unexpected Productions has, since 1997, hosted The Seattle Festival of International Improvisation. The festival gathers individual improvisers from around the world, who train together for a week long period, culminating in several performances. The festival has traditionally been held in June, around the anniversary of Unexpected Productions.

See also
 Improvisational theatre
 List of improvisational theatre companies
 Gum Wall

External links 
Main Website

Sources

Improvisational theatre
Improvisational troupes
Companies based in Seattle
Pike Place Market
Central Waterfront, Seattle